Falso Azufre is a complex volcano at the border of Argentina and Chile.

The highest summit Cerro Falso Azufre lies at the western end in Chile, which has mostly generated pyroclastic material from craters. The probably youngest segment of the volcano is the eastern section in Argentina, where two lava domes and two cones are located; these form the Dos Conos volcano.

Blocky lava flows, some of them quite large, form the bulk of the volcano. Neighbouring volcanoes are Nevado San Francisco, the Laguna Amarga caldera and Laguna Verde volcanoes; additional volcanics are of Miocene to Pliocene age. The Kunstmann edifice probably counts as a separate volcano as well.

The volcano has erupted trachyandesite, andesite and dacite. The rocks contain hornblende and pyroxene with a total content of 58-61% of SiO2 and form a potassium-rich calc-alkaline suite. In some parts of the volcano, its rocks have suffered hydrothermal alteration.

A number of dates have been obtained on Falso Azufre; with the exception of the oldest ones on the Kunstmann edifice (3.5 to 2.9 million years ago) Falso Azufre has only yielded ages of less than one million years, with older dates found in the western part of the volcano and the younger dates of less than 400,000 years ago in the eastern part; the absolutely youngest date was obtained on a lava flow linked to Dos Conos; 160,000 ± 80,000 years ago. Falso Azufre could thus be considered an extinct volcano, although recent activity cannot be ruled out. While the remoteness of the volcano reduces any hazard potential future pyroclastic eruptions could impact air traffic over the region and east of it; further a major road is close to the volcano.

Falso Azufre is part of the Central Volcanic Zone of the Andes together with about 110 other Quaternary volcanoes, and lies in the southern sector of the volcanic zone; other volcanic zones in the Andes are the Northern Volcanic Zone, the Southern Volcanic Zone and the Austral Volcanic Zone. The history of volcanic activity is poorly known for most of these volcanoes owing to the lack of dating; only a few historical eruptions have been recorded, such as an eruption at Ojos del Salado in 1993.

See also
Cerro Torta
List of volcanoes in Chile
List of volcanoes in Argentina

References 

 

Volcanoes of Atacama Region
Volcanoes of Catamarca Province
Complex volcanoes
Subduction volcanoes
Mountains of Catamarca Province
Mountains of Atacama Region
Polygenetic volcanoes
Argentina–Chile border
International mountains of South America